Lauren Tsai (born February 11, 1998), is an American visual artist, model, and actress. She is best known to audiences for her appearance in the Fuji TV and Netflix series Terrace House: Aloha State. She made her acting debut in the third and final season of Legion, a television series based on the Marvel Comics character of the same name.

Life 
Lauren Tsai was born on February 11, 1998, in Wellesley, Massachusetts, United States.

Her family moved to Honolulu, Hawaii when she was seven years old.

Career 
After moving out of the show's Honolulu house, she continued to pursue her modeling and artistic work. As a model, she's since appeared in a number of magazines, commercials, catalogs and fashion shows, including in Japan and Hawaii.

In 2018, she drew a variant cover for issue No. 1 of West Coast Avengers. In 2019, she followed with a variant cover for Captain Marvel No. 1. She also collaborated with Marc Jacobs on a line of apparel and accessories.

In January 2019, she was cast in the third and final season of the FX series Legion as Switch, a young mutant who has time travelling abilities. She then starred in the 2021 Netflix film Moxie, directed by Amy Poehler.

Artistry 
Tsai describes her sketchbook as "probably my most cherished item."

Works

Filmography

Film

Television

References

External links 
 
 
 

1998 births
Living people
21st-century American actresses
21st-century American women artists
American people of Italian descent
American people of Polish descent
American people of Scottish descent
American people of English descent
American people of Irish descent
American people of German descent
American models of Chinese descent
American artists of Chinese descent
American women illustrators
American illustrators
American female comics artists
Hawaii people of Chinese descent
Female models from Hawaii
Female models from Massachusetts
American expatriates in Japan
American women painters
Illustrators of fairy tales
American surrealist artists